is a movement among Japanese musicians that is characterized by the use of varying levels of make-up, elaborate hair styles and flamboyant costumes, often, but not always, coupled with androgynous aesthetics, similar to Western glam rock.

Some Western sources consider visual kei a music genre, with its sound usually related to glam rock, punk rock and heavy metal. However, visual kei acts play various genres, including those considered by some as unrelated to rock such as electronic, pop, etc. Other sources, including members of the movement themselves, state that it is not a music genre and that the freedom of expression, fashion, and participation in the related subculture is what exemplifies the use of the term.

Etymology
The term "visual kei" was derived from one of X Japan's slogans, "Psychedelic Violence Crime of Visual Shock", seen on the cover of their second studio album Blue Blood (1989). This derivation is credited as being coined by Seiichi Hoshiko, the founding editor of Shoxx magazine, which was founded in 1990 as the first publication devoted to the subject. However, he explained in a 2018 interview with JRock News that visual kei was technically coined, or at least inspired by, X Japan's lead guitarist hide. Hoshiko also said that at the time they were called , "but it simply felt... too cheap... Even though X Japan was a big band and people used the term 'Okeshou kei' to describe them, the term was still lacking substance, I didn't like the term at all! Because of this, I tried to remind all the writers to not use this term as 'They are not okeshou kei, they are visual-shock kei'. From there, it went from 'Visual-shock kei' to 'Visual-kei' to 'V-kei'. After we spread the word, fans naturally abbreviated it to 'V-kei'. The Japanese love to abbreviate everything as a matter of fact." Hoshiko considers visual kei a distinctive Japanese music genre and defined it "as the music itself along with all the visual aspects of it."

History

1980–1992: Origins and success
Visual kei emerged in the 1980s underground scene, pioneered by bands such as X Japan, Dead End, Buck-Tick, D'erlanger, and Color. Japanese pop culture website Real Sound wrote that similarities between the appearances and behaviour of the founders of visual kei and members of the yankī delinquent subculture are often noted. The movement designated a new form of Japanese rock music influenced by Western hard rock and glam rock/metal acts like David Bowie, Kiss, Twisted Sister, Hanoi Rocks, Mötley Crüe, as well as punk-gothic rock and was established in the late 1980s and early 1990s. In The George Mason Review, Megan Pfeifle described the movement as being roughly divided into two generations, with the first in three transitional eras, of which the first era lasted just over a decade.

In the late 1980s and until the mid-1990s, visual kei received increasing popularity throughout Japan, when album sales from such bands started to reach record numbers. The first band with recordings that achieved notable success was Dead End, whose independent album Dead Line (1986) sold over 20,000 copies, and whose major label debut album Ghost of Romance (1987) released by Victor Entertainment reached No. 14 on the Oricon Albums Chart. That same year, Buck-Tick released their major debut Sexual XXXXX! through the same record label. Dead End even had two albums released by American label Metal Blade Records. In 1990, D'erlanger's second album Basilisk reached No. 5 on the Oricon chart, but they and Dead End both disbanded that same year.

In 1988 and 1989, Buck-Tick and X Japan started to gain mainstream success that continues to present-day. Buck Tick's single "Just One More Kiss" entered No. 6 on the Oricon Singles Chart, while their studio albums Seventh Heaven (1988) and Taboo (1989) charted at No. 3 and 1 respectively and were the first Japanese rock band to hold a concert at the Tokyo Dome. They continue to have success, with nearly all of their subsequent albums reaching the top ten on the charts. X Japan's first album, the independently released Vanishing Vision, reached No. 19 in 1988, making them the first indie band to appear on the main Oricon Albums Chart. Their second and major debut album Blue Blood (1989) reached number 6 and has since sold 712,000 copies. Their third and best-selling album Jealousy was released in 1991, topped the charts and sold over 1 million copies. They went on to release two more number one studio albums, Art of Life (1993) and Dahlia (1996). In 1992, X Japan tried to launch an attempt to enter the American market, even signing with Atlantic Records for a US album, but this ultimately did not happen.

Two record labels formed in 1986, Extasy Records (Tokyo) and Free-Will (Osaka), were instrumental in promoting the visual kei scene. Extasy was created by X Japan drummer and leader Yoshiki and signed bands, not limited to visual kei acts, that would go on to make marks on the Japanese music scene, including Zi:Kill, Tokyo Yankees and Ladies Room. Luna Sea and Glay, who both went on to sell millions of records, with Glay being one of Japan's best-selling musical acts, had their first albums released by Extasy in 1991 and 1994 respectively. Free-Will was founded by Color vocalist and leader Dynamite Tommy, and while at the time not as popular as Extasy, it had many moderately successful acts, such as By-Sexual and Kamaitachi.

1993–2000: Expansion and decline

Pfeifle described the second transition era as beginning in 1993 with bands such as L'Arc-en-Ciel, Glay (although formed in 1988, their first album was released in 1994) and Malice Mizer. They gained mainstream awareness, although they were not as commercially successful, except for L'Arc-en-Ciel and Glay whose later huge success was accompanied by a drastic change in their appearance and are often not associated with visual kei. Around 1995, visual kei bands experienced a booming success in the general population, which lasted for four years. According to Pfeifle, the third transition era began by bands such as La'cryma Christi, Penicillin and Rouage achieving moderate success. At the time, "the big four of visual kei" were Malice Mizer, La'cryma Christi, Shazna and Fanatic Crisis. In 1998, Pierrot released their major debut single, and Dir en grey's three major label singles were released with the help of Yoshiki the following year. They were called "the big two" in the scene at that time.

Around the early 1990s, a visual kei scene that placed more emphasize on music rather than fashion arouse in the city of Nagoya, and as such was later dubbed Nagoya kei. Silver-Rose (formed in 1989) and Kuroyume (formed in 1991) were described as the "Nagoya big two" in the underground scene, and with Laputa (formed in 1993), are credited with "creating the early Nagoya kei style." During the 1990s, several other conceptual subgenres like Eroguro kei (notably represented by Cali Gari), Angura kei (underground style, wearing traditional kimono or Japanese uniforms) and Ouji kei or Kodona kei (prince style or boy style, notably Plastic Tree) emerged.

By the late 1990s, the mainstream popularity of visual kei was declining; Luna Sea went on a year-long hiatus in 1997 before disbanding in 2000, X Japan disbanded at the end of 1997 and one year later their lead guitarist hide died. In 1999, Malice Mizer's drummer Kami died after the departure of singer Gackt, who with a toned down appearance became one of the most popular and successful visual kei solo singers, and L'Arc-en-Ciel publicly distanced themselves from the movement (although, in 2012 they were partly promoted internationally as a visual kei band). In 1998, Billboards Steve McClure commented that "To a certain extent, hide's death means the end of an era, X were the first generation of visual kei bands, but the novelty has worn off. For the next generation of bands, it's like: That's it. The torch has been passed to us". As other bands could not meet financial expectations, most major companies backed out of the movement, and it became an underground style often associated with the rebellious generation, non-conforming to proper society.

2001–2009: International expansion and Neo-Visual Kei

A second generation emerged in small visual kei-specific live houses managed by record companies like PS Company (Free-Will) and Maverick DC Group. The difference between the first and second generation is that the second; has no straightforward music style, ranging from metal to pop, but still seemingly focused on heavy rock genres; the fashion and gender ambiguities are of central importance. Although economically not very significant in the Japanese music market, it became the first Japanese music to succeed on an international scale.

Notable newer visual kei bands include Dir en grey, The Gazette, Alice Nine, D'espairsRay and Girugamesh, as well as solo performer Miyavi, who have all performed overseas. Veterans of the scene also established new acts, such as Malice Mizer's Mana with his band Moi dix Mois and three members of Pierrot forming Angelo. In 2007, visual kei was revitalized as Luna Sea performed a one-off performance and X Japan officially reunited with a new single and a world tour. From this generation the subgenre  emerged, where the musicians produce upbeat pop rock and wear bright colorful attire. Pioneers of this style include Baroque, Kra, Charlotte and An Cafe.

Although the first international concert by a visual kei act was held in Taiwan by Luna Sea in 1999, it was not until 2002 that many visual kei bands started to perform worldwide (United States, in Europe from 2004), with the initial interest coming from Japanese-themed conventions like A-Kon. In the first five years Dir en grey was especially well received. In 2007, the Jrock Revolution event was held in Los Angeles and featured visual kei bands. Although some bands like The Gazette have played at Tokyo Dome (not at full capacity), the majority of acts play in much smaller venues like Shibuya O-East. In 2009 the V-Rock Festival at Makuhari Messe was reported as the "world's largest Visual Kei music festival" gathering over 50 "visual artists," although this included some Western acts like Marilyn Manson. A second V-Rock Festival was held in 2011 at Saitama Super Arena.

2009–present: Reunions and further expansion

Dead End officially reunited in 2009 and La'cryma Christi (which disbanded in 2007) reunited for an anniversary tour in 2010. Kiyoharu announced the reformations of both Kuroyume and Sads, and Luna Sea reunited and began a world tour.

As an epilogue to their 25th anniversary, Luna Sea hosted a rock festival titled Lunatic Fest on 27 and 28 June 2015, with an estimated 60,000 fans attending. Held at Makuhari Messe, there were three stages and 12 artists, most visual kei acts including X Japan, Dead End, Dir en grey, Siam Shade and Tokyo Yankees the first night, and Aion, Buck-Tick, D'erlanger, Glay and Mucc the second night.

A large three-day visual kei rock festival titled Visual Japan Summit was held at Makuhari Messe between October 14–16, 2016. Luna Sea hosted another two-day Lunatic Fest at Makuhari Messe on June 23 and 24, 2018.

According to sales figures from online music store CDJapan, some of the internationally popular visual kei acts on the late 2010s include The Gazette, Kamijo, Nocturnal Bloodlust, Versailles, Jupiter, Mejibray, lynch., Dimlim, Matenrou Opera, Miyavi, D, Diaura, Dadaroma, Initial'L, A9, Buck-Tick, Yoshiki, Hyde, Luna Sea, Mucc, Hizaki and Gackt.

In 2021, visual kei journalist Chiaki Fujitani noted how newer acts were combining visual kei with other elements to create originality. She cited Nocturnal Bloodlust's muscular vocalist Hiro for defying the usual delicate appearance of visual kei musicians, 0.1g no Gosan for utilizing tropes of underground idols, such as playing tug of war with fans during concerts, Choke for their avant-garde form of rap metal, and former D'espairsRay drummer Tsukasa Mogamigawa for being the first visual kei enka singer.

Criticism
There has been criticism directed at newer visual kei bands for having lost the spirit of their forefathers by copying each other in design and sound, and becoming all the same. As far back as 1998, Neil Strauss reported that to visual kei bands "after X" makeup and outrageous looks became "more important than music." Several musicians have expressed their discontent; in 2008, Kirito (Pierrot, Angelo) said "now it's more like people are dressing up a certain way because they want to be visual kei or look visual kei. They are doing it to look like others instead of doing it to look different. This is obviously very different from when we started out more than ten years ago," while Sugizo (Luna Sea) stated in 2010 that "they cannot make good sounds and music is more like a hobby for them. I cannot feel their soul in the music."

Although almost from the newer generation himself, Dir en grey bassist Toshiya said in 2010 "to be honest, when we first started and we were wearing a lot of makeup on stage and stuff, there were a lot of bands doing that at the time in Japan and people thought it was cool. But not anymore, ha ha." and added "the music was so unique, too – bands like X Japan. At that time, there weren't any two bands that sounded alike; these days everyone sounds exactly the same." Kenzi (Kamaitachi, The Dead Pop Stars, Anti Feminism) commented in 2009 that "back in the day, there were bands, but people would try to do things differently. Nowadays, there's one band and everyone copies off of them," with Free-Will founder and Color frontman Tommy concluding with "I don't think our breed of visual kei exists anymore." Kiyoharu (Kuroyume, Sads) in 2013 said that although him, Ryuichi (Luna Sea) and Hyde (L'Arc-en-Ciel) were influenced by Morrie (Dead End), they "sublimated each other" inventing something new, but younger generation artists are more imitative, making in Morrie's perspective "Manet of his Manet's Manet". Morrie in the same interview added that the problem with new visual kei bands is that "they're established as a genre... well, there's probably a part of it that's business-wise, but it wouldn't be fun if it got stiff. I would like to see people who are trying to break through that area. It doesn't matter how good you are, whether you're doing it on the visual kei route or not, it's something fundamental."

Time Out Tokyo'''s Bunny Bissoux concluded in 2015 that the movement "today is basically a parallel of the J-pop idol system" and "that originally prided itself on being different, it now attracts those who want to 'look' visual kei. Genuine originality (in the music, at least) seems to be dying out." In 2018, Seiichi Hoshiko said that he was worried about this trend's effect on the movement's future.

Popularity

Visual kei has enjoyed popularity among independent underground projects, as well as artists achieving mainstream success, with influences from Western phenomena, such as glam, goth and cyberpunk. The music performed encompasses a large variety of genres, i.e. punk, metal, pop and electronica.

Magazines published regularly in Japan with visual kei coverage are Arena 37 °C, Cure, Fool's Mate Express, Shoxx, Shock Wave, Rock and Read among others. The popularity and awareness of visual kei groups outside Japan has seen an increase in recent years, mostly through internet and Japanese anime, shown for example by German magazines Peach (discontinued in 2011) and Koneko, as well European record label Gan-Shin. The biggest fan communities are found in United States, Germany, Poland, Russia, France and Brazil and to some extent Finland, Chile and Sweden.

From these international youth subcultures and influence emerged bands like Cinema Bizarre, but they hesitate to consider themselves as visual kei because are not ethnically Japanese and instead as glam rock. Despite the existence of visually similar music acts in the West such as Marilyn Manson, Tokio Hotel and Lady Gaga, Pfeifle said that the androgynous look of visual kei bands often has a repulsive effect on Westerners.

According to the musicologists, the Lacanist psychoanalysis of the subculture indicates that the fascination with the singer's voice (the lack of understanding amplifies the effect), as well ineffable and unfulfillable desire, are what attracts most of the (predominantly female) fans to the groups on an international scale. The female fans show a behavioral pattern while attending the concerts, and there are several furi (movements) like tesensu (arm fan), gyakudai (reversed dive), hedoban (headbang), saku (spread hands in the air). The explicit fan fiction and homoerotic acts on the stage by some musicians called fan sabisu'' (fan service; a sexual term borrowed from manga culture), are related to the Lacanian man's type of desire (to be recognized by the other, desire of the other), i.e. the female fans do not desire the musician himself, but his desire; a kind of cultural social training ground for the inescapable process of learning how to desire.

Gallery

See also 

 List of visual kei musical groups
 Japanese rock
 Japanese metal

Notes

References

English

Japanese

External links
 

 
Japanese fashion
Japanese styles of music
Japanese subcultures
Punk rock genres
Heavy metal genres
Rock music genres
Music genres
Androgyny